Andolika is a Carnatic raga, which is also sometimes written as Andholika.  This raga is a janya of the 22nd Melakarta raga Kharaharapriya.

Structure and Lakshana 

This ragam is an asymmetric scale and is classified as an audava-audava ragam (five notes in the ascending and descending scale).

: 
: 

The notes in this scale are chatushruti rishabham, shuddha madhyamam, panchamam, kaisiki nishadham in arohana and additional chatushruti dhaivatam in avarohanam, in place of panchamam (see pictures). From Kharaharapriya scale (22nd melakarta), the gandharam is removed in this scale and the rest are used in asymmetrical manner. Since gandharam is removed this scale can also be considered a janya of 28th mela Harikambhoji scale, but since 22 comes ahead many prefer to use the association with Kharaharapriya.

Select compositions 
Mahishashura a varnam set to Adi talam composed by Muthiah Bhagavatar
Raga Sudha Rasa in Adi by Thyagaraja
Sevikka Vendumayya in Adi by Muthu Thandavar

Film Songs

Language:Tamil

Related rāgams 
This section covers the theoretical and scientific aspect of this rāgam.

Scale similarities 
Madhyamavati is a rāgam which has a symmetric scale matching the ascending scale of Andolika (descending scale also has panchamam instead of chatusruti dhaivatam). Its  structure is S R2 M1 P N2 S : S N2 P M1 R2 S
Kedaragaula is a rāgam which has the same ascending scale as Andolika and descending scale of Harikambhoji. Its  structure is S R2 M1 P N2 S : S N2 D2 P M1 G3 R2 S

Notes

References

Janya ragas
Janya ragas (kharaharapriya)